Marie Anne Doublet (23 August 1677 – May 1771), known as Doublet de Persan, Legendre, was a French scholar, writer and salonnière.  She was born and died in Paris.

French salon-holders
1677 births
1771 deaths
18th-century French women writers
18th-century French writers
Writers from Paris